O Amor Natural  is a 1996 Dutch documentary film directed by Heddy Honigmann. The film was shot in Rio de Janeiro, Brazil in Portuguese.

External links 
 
 O Amor Natural at Icarus Films

1996 documentary films
1996 films
Films directed by Heddy Honigmann
1990s Portuguese-language films
Dutch documentary films